The 2007 Houston Cougars football team, also known as the Houston Cougars, Houston, or UH, represented the University of Houston in the 2007 NCAA Division I FBS football season.  It was the 62nd year of season play for Houston.  The team was coached by fifth-year head football coach, Art Briles.  The team played its home games at Robertson Stadium, a 32,000-person capacity stadium on-campus in Houston.  Competing against the TCU Horned Frogs in the 2007 Texas Bowl, the Cougars fell short, 20–13.

Schedule

References

Houston
Houston Cougars football seasons
Houston Cougars football